The discography of Australian singer Samantha Jade consists of four studio albums, twenty-four singles (including four as a featured artist), ten promotional singles and eleven music videos. After being announced as the winner of the fourth season of The X Factor Australia in 2012, Jade released her winner's single "What You've Done to Me", which debuted at number one on the ARIA Singles Chart and was certified triple platinum by the Australian Recording Industry Association for sales of 210,000 copies.

Studio albums

Extended plays

Singles

As lead artist

As featured artist

Promotional singles

Other charted songs

Album appearances

Music videos

Notes

References

External links
 
 [ Samantha Jade] at AllMusic

Discographies of Australian artists
Pop music discographies